There are many memorials dedicated to American singer and actor Elvis Presley.

Statues

United States

Outside United States

Memorials and other works

United States

Outside United States

References

 Statues